Väsby IK FK was a Swedish football club located in based in the Stockholm suburb of Upplands Väsby. It was the football section of sports club Väsby IK.

Background
Väsby IK Fotboll was founded in 1924.

From 1996 To 2004 Väsby IK FK played in Division 2 Östra Svealand which is the third tier of Swedish football. They play their home matches at the Vilundavallen in Upplands Väsby.

The clubs association football department merged with FC Café Opera United in 2005 to form Väsby United, which later became AFC Eskilstuna. In 2013, after AFC United relocated to Solna, Väsby IK FK once again formed their own football department.

The club was affiliated to Stockholms Fotbollförbund. In 2018 they were declared bankrupt and dissolved. Parsian IF relocated to Upplands Väsby and renamed themselves Parsian Väsby IF and they now play on Vilundavallen.

Season to season

Footnotes

External links
 Väsby IK FK – Official website

Association football clubs disestablished in 2018
Defunct football clubs in Sweden
Football clubs in Stockholm
1924 establishments in Sweden
Association football clubs established in 1924